The State Register of Heritage Places is maintained by the Heritage Council of Western Australia. , 140 places are heritage-listed in the City of Cockburn, of which 21 are on the State Register of Heritage Places.

List

State Register of Heritage Places
The Western Australian State Register of Heritage Places, lists the following 21 state registered places within the City of Cockburn:

City of Cockburn heritage-listed places
The following places are heritage listed in the City of Cockburn but are not State registered:

References

Cockburn